An electric-steam locomotive is a steam locomotive that uses electricity to heat the water in the boiler to create steam instead of burning fuel in a firebox. This is a highly unusual type of locomotive that only makes economic sense under specific conditions. Normally, it would be much more efficient to build and use an electric locomotive. However, lack of time and resources (as during wartime), lack of coal or similar fuel, and the presence of relatively cheap and available electricity may make conversion of an existing steam locomotive into an electric-steam locomotive a viable proposition.

Switzerland
Switzerland has no natural reserves of coal, but the mountainous region offers plentiful, and cheap, hydroelectricity.  of SBB lines (73.6% of the network) were electrified by the outbreak of the Second World War, whilst the price of imported (German) coal kept rising.

In an attempt to save on coal the Swiss Federal Railways fitted two small 0-6-0 steam shunters of class E 3/3 with a pantograph. The modified E 3/3 8521 was brought into use on 13 January 1943; 8522 followed on 11 February 1943. They could run up to 20 minutes without power supply, like a fireless locomotive, once the boiler had been charged to full pressure. The firebox was retained, usually keeping hot embers, with a classic fire for longer operation on non-electrified tracks. The water circulation pump, the control circuit and the lighting were powered by a battery that was charged from a rectifier fed by one of the transformers.

Bringing the locomotive to pressure took about one hour.

The electric heaters were removed in 1951 from locomotive 8521 and in 1953 from 8522. As of 2013, locomotive E 3/3 8522 is still in (museum) service on the Sursee–Triengen railway as an ordinary steam engine with no electric heating.

Canada
A Canadian patent for an electric-steam locomotive was granted as recently as 1992. The drawing shows a Crampton type 8-4-0 but its intended use is unknown.

Electric pre-heater
A conventional coal-fired or oil-fired steam locomotive may be prepared for service by using an external electric pre-heater. This allows steam to be raised gradually during the night so that the locomotive will be ready for use in the morning.

Modern steam locomotives, such as the rack locomotives of Brienz–Rothorn railway and DLM's modernised class 52.80 locomotive, are fitted with internal electric heaters.
This allows keeping the well insulated boiler warm overnight or even to start heating automatically in the early morning.

Models
The electric-steam system is also used in some small-scale model steam locomotives.

In September 2003 Hornby Railways released its first steam-powered 00 gauge locomotive, a scale model locomotive where the boiler is heated by electric power collected from the running rails.

Literature 
 Alfred Moser: Der Dampfbetrieb der schweizerischen Eisenbahnen 1847–1966. 4. nachgeführte Auflage. Birkhäuser, Stuttgart 1967, S. 269. (detailed description in German)

See also
 Electric locomotive
 Electric steam boiler
 Heilmann locomotive
 List of steam technology patents
 Steam turbine electric locomotive

References

Additional reading

External links 
 Pictures on www.douglas-self.com
 Elektrische Dampflokomotive

Steam locomotives
Electric locomotives